North Korea participated at the 2006 Asian Games held in Doha, Qatar from 1 to 15 December 2006. North Korea ranked 16th in the medal table with 6 gold medals.

It marched together with South Korea at the opening ceremony under the Korean Unification Flag, but both countries competed as separate teams at the event.

Background 

North Korea is a member of the Olympic Council of Asia and has competed in the Asian Games since the 1974 Asian Games in Tehran.

Archery 

North Korea sent three athletes to participate in archery, all of which were female. As a team, North Korea finished fourth in recurve. For the individual rankings, North Korea finished 10th and 11th.

Boxing 

Four North Korean pugilists went to the Games. Kim Song-guk received the bronze medal in the Feather 57Kg category. Song-guk had a bye during the qualification round. In the preliminary and quarterfinal rounds, he won by RSCOS. In the semifinals, he lost by points.

Wushu 

Won To-Song was the only athlete sent from North Korea to participate in the sanda 60 kg wushu. He had a bye during the first preliminary round, and won 2-0 against Afghanistan's Amirshah Amiri in the second preliminary round. During the Quarterfinals, he lost 2-1 to India's M. Bimoljit Singh.

Medalists

References

Korea, North
2006
Asian Games